Cilly Aussem defeated Hilde Krahwinkel in the final, 6–2, 7–5 to win the ladies' singles tennis title at the 1931 Wimbledon Championships.

Helen Moody was the defending champion, but did not participate.

Seeds

  'Cilly Aussem (champion)'  Betty Nuthall (quarterfinals)  Simonne Mathieu (semifinals)  Hilde Krahwinkel (final)  Lilí de Álvarez (third round) 
  Helen Jacobs (semifinals)  Phyllis Mudford (third round)  Eileen Fearnley-Whittingstall (fourth round)''

Draw

Finals

Top half

Section 1

Section 2

Section 3

Section 4

Bottom half

Section 5

Section 6

Section 7

Section 8

References

External links

Women's Singles
Wimbledon Championship by year – Women's singles
Wimbledon Championships - singles
Wimbledon Championships - singles